"The Other Side of Love" is a 1982 song by Yazoo

The Other Side Of Love or Other Side of Love may also refer to

Books
 Love, Volume VI: The Other Side of Love, 1980 romantic novel by Denise Robins
 The Other Side of Love, 1991 novel about World War II by Jacqueline Briskin

Film and television
 The Other Side of Love, DVD release name of Locked Up: A Mother's Rage starring Cheryl Ladd 1991
 The Other Side of Love, 2011 Nigerian film with Okawa Shaznay

Music

Albums
 The Other Side of Love, album by Gail Davies Gail Davies discography
 The Other Side Of Love, album by Neil "Mad Professor" Fraser with Carroll Thompson
 The Other Side Of Love, album by Amy Stroup songs written by Trent Dabbs
 The Other Side of Love, album by Al Campbell 1981

Songs
 Other Side of Love, Sean Paul 2014
 "Other Side Of Love", 1985 single by Joe Kubek from Smokin' Joe Kubek
 "The Other Side of Love", song by Ryuichi Sakamoto 1997
 "The Other Side of Love", song by The Caravelles, Callander & Murray 1968
 "The Other Side of Love", song by Evelyn King, written Lester & Brown, from I'm in Love (Evelyn King album) 1981
 "The Other Side of Love", single by Jimmy Witherspoon, written by Jerry Goldstein
 "The Other Side of Love", song by Johnny Long J.Long	
 "The Other Side of Love", song by from I'm in Love (Evelyn "Champagne" King song)
 "The Other Side of Love", song by Emyli (m-flo feat. Sister E) Beat Space Nine 2003
 "The Other Side of Love", song by Shanley Del, written by Leslie Mills 2002